New Space may refer to:

 New Space (Uruguay), a political party in Uruguay
 NewSpace, a landmark university building in Newcastle, Australia